Ancistrus martini is a species of catfish in the family Loricariidae. It is native to South America, where it occurs in the Zulia River basin, which is part of the Catatumbo River drainage, which itself is part of the Lake Maracaibo drainage system in Venezuela. The species reaches 8.9 cm (3.5 inches) SL.

References 

martini
Catfish of South America
Fish described in 1944